Sally Siegrist (October 5, 1951 – May 1, 2022) was an American politician who served in the Indiana House of Representatives from House District 26 from 2016 to 2018. She died on May 1, 2022.

References

1951 births
2022 deaths
Republican Party members of the Indiana House of Representatives
Women state legislators in Indiana
People from Lafayette, Indiana
Indiana University alumni
Purdue University alumni
21st-century American women politicians
21st-century American politicians